Ryan Nelson Eades (born December 15, 1991) is an American former professional baseball pitcher. He played in Major League Baseball (MLB) for the Minnesota Twins and Baltimore Orioles.

Career

Amateur
Eades attended Northshore High School in Slidell, Louisiana. He played for the school's baseball team, but could not pitch for the last part of his junior season and all of his senior season after a shoulder injury required surgery on his labrum. After the injury, he played as a first baseman and designated hitter. The Colorado Rockies selected him in the 19th round of the 2010 MLB draft, but he did not sign. Eades enrolled at Louisiana State University (LSU) to play college baseball for the LSU Tigers. In the summer of 2011, he played collegiate summer baseball for the Bourne Braves of the Cape Cod Baseball League, and was named the league's pitcher of the year. In his junior year at LSU, he pitched to a 2.79 ERA with 78 strikeouts in 100 innings.

Minnesota Twins
The Minnesota Twins selected Eades in the second round, with the 43rd overall selection, of the 2013 MLB draft. He signed with the Twins, receiving a $1.29 million signing bonus. After signing, he was assigned to the Elizabethton Twins of the Rookie-level Appalachian League and spent the whole season there, pitching to a 4.60 ERA in 15.2 innings. He played for the Cedar Rapids Kernels of the Class A Midwest League in 2014, compiling a 10–11 record and 5.14 ERA in 26 games (25 starts), and the Fort Myers Miracle of the Class A-Advanced Florida State League in 2015, going 6–3 with a 3.11 ERA and 1.24 WHIP in 20 starts. Eades spent the 2016 season with the Chattanooga Lookouts of the Class AA Southern League where he was 6–5 with a 4.61 ERA in 113.1 innings, and began the 2017 season with the Lookouts, before receiving a midseason promotion to the Rochester Red Wings of the Class AAA International League. In 30 total games between Chattanooga and Rochester in 2017, Eades pitched to a 6–3 record and 3.40 ERA in 30 games.

He opened the 2019 season with Rochester. On June 8, 2019, his contract was selected and he was promoted to the major leagues. He made his debut that day versus the Detroit Tigers, throwing two scoreless innings in relief. Eades debuted wearing the jersey number 80, becoming the first player in Major League history to wear the number in a regular season game.

Baltimore Orioles
Eades was claimed off waivers by the Baltimore Orioles and optioned to the Triple-A Norfolk Tides on August 14, 2019. Eades was outrighted off the Orioles roster on October 30, 2019, and became a free agent.

Houston Astros
On May 4, 2021, Eades signed a minor league contract with the Houston Astros organization. Eades appeared in 7 games split between the Rookie League FCL Astros and Triple-A Sugar Land Skeeters, struggling to a 7.71 ERA with 12 strikeouts. On August 20, Eades was released by the Astros.

Lancaster Barnstormers
On August 27, 2021, Eades signed with the Lancaster Barnstormers of the Atlantic League of Professional Baseball.

On May 27, 2022, Eades announced his retirement from professional baseball via Instagram.

Personal life
Eades has a younger brother, who is also a baseball player. His father, Ned, used to play professional baseball and coached the baseball team at Northshore. Ned died in 2004 of lymphoma. His mother, Marian, coaches the softball team at Northshore. Eades proposed to his girlfriend, Alexa, after the 2013 season, and they were married in November 2015. They were featured on Say Yes to the Dress.

References

External links

Living people
1991 births
People from Slidell, Louisiana
Baseball players from Louisiana
Major League Baseball pitchers
Minnesota Twins players
Baltimore Orioles players
LSU Tigers baseball players
Bourne Braves players
Elizabethton Twins players
Cedar Rapids Kernels players
Fort Myers Miracle players
Chattanooga Lookouts players
Rochester Red Wings players
Norfolk Tides players
Surprise Saguaros players
Sugar Land Skeeters players
Florida Complex League Astros players